The Prophet Returns is a posthumous compilation album by American hip hop artist Tupac Shakur, released on October 3, 2005 by Death Row Records and Koch Records. It features mostly songs from Shakur's 1996 album, All Eyez on Me.

Track listing

2005 compilation albums
Tupac Shakur compilation albums
Albums produced by Daz Dillinger
Death Row Records compilation albums
Compilation albums published posthumously